Marthinus Christoffel Dreyer (born 25 August 1988) is a South African rugby union player who last played for the  in the Pro14. His regular position is prop.

Career

Youth

Leopards
He didn't appear for them in 2012, but did play in four matches in the 2013 Vodacom Cup tournament.

Boland Cavaliers
He joined  for the start of 2014.

Representative rugby
In 2013, he was included in a South Africa President's XV team that played in the 2013 IRB Tbilisi Cup and won the tournament after winning all three matches.

Dax
He joined French side  for the 2015–16 Rugby Pro D2 season.

Blue Bulls

Slava Moscow 
In 2019 he joined Russian Slava Moscow club.

Varsity Rugby

References

South African rugby union players
Living people
1988 births
People from Rustenburg
Rugby union props
Leopards (rugby union) players
Stormers players
Boland Cavaliers players
US Dax players
Southern Kings players
Blue Bulls players
Bulls (rugby union) players
Slava Moscow players
Rugby union players from North West (South African province)